glTF is a standard file format for three-dimensional scenes and models. A glTF file uses one of two possible file extensions: .gltf (JSON/ASCII) or .glb (binary). Both .gltf and .glb files may reference external binary and texture resources. Alternatively, both formats may be self-contained by directly embedding binary data buffers (as base64-encoded strings in .gltf files or as raw byte arrays in .glb files). An open standard developed and maintained by the Khronos Group, it supports 3D model geometry, appearance, scene graph hierarchy, and animation. It is intended to be a streamlined, interoperable format for the delivery of 3D assets, while minimizing file size and runtime processing by apps. As such, its creators have described it as the "JPEG of 3D."

Releases

glTF 1.0 
The file format was conceived in 2012 by members of the COLLADA working group. At SIGGRAPH 2012, Khronos presented a demo of glTF, which was then called WebGL Transmissions Format (WebGL TF). On October 19, 2015, the glTF 1.0 specification was released.

Adoption of glTF 1.0 
At SIGGRAPH 2016, Oculus announced their adoption of glTF citing the similarities to their ovrscene format. In October 2016, Microsoft joined the 3D Formats working group at Khronos to collaborate on glTF.

glTF 2.0 
The second version, glTF 2.0, was released in June 2017, and is a complete overhaul of the file format from version 1.0, with most tools adopting the 2.0 version. Based on a proposal by Fraunhofer originally presented at SIGGRAPH 2016, Physically based rendering (PBR) was added, replacing WebGL shaders used in glTF 1.0. Other upgrades include sparse accessors and morph targets for techniques such as facial animation, and schema tweaks and breaking changes for corner cases or performance such as replacing top-level glTF object properties with arrays for faster index-based access. There is ongoing work towards import and export in Unity and an integrated multi-engine viewer / validator.

Adoption of glTF 2.0 
On March 3, 2017, Microsoft announced that they will be using glTF 2.0 as the 3D asset format across their product line, including Paint 3D, 3D Viewer, Remix 3D, Babylon.js, and Microsoft Office. Sketchfab also announced support for glTF 2.0. As of 2019, the glTF and GLB formats are used on and supported by companies including DGG, UX3D, Sketchfab, Facebook, Microsoft, Oculus, Google, Adobe, Box, TurboSquid, Unreal Engine and Qt Quick 3D. The format has been noted as an important standard for augmented reality, integrating with modeling software such as Autodesk Maya, Autodesk 3ds Max, and Poly.

In February 2020, the Smithsonian Institution launched their Open Access Initiative, releasing approximately 2.8 million 2D images and 3D models into the public domain, delivering the 3D models in glTF.

In July 2022, glTF 2.0 was released as the ISO/IEC 12113:2022 International Standard. Khronos stated they will make regular submissions to bring updates and new widely adopted glTF functionality into refreshed versions of ISO/IEC 12113 to ensure that there is no long-term divergence between the ISO/IEC and Khronos specifications.

Extensions 
A glTF file uses either a .gltf or .glb extension. PBR extensions model the physical properties of real-world objects, allowing developers to create realistic 3D assets that correspond to the actual materials in the object. As new PBR extensions are released, they continue to expand PBR capabilities within the glTF framework, allowing a wider range of scenes and objects to be realistically rendered as 3D assets.

The KTX 2.0 extension for universal texture compression enables 3D models in the glTF format to be highly compressed and to use natively supported texture formats, reducing file size and boosting rendering speed.

Draco is a glTF extension for mesh compression, to compress and decompress 3D meshes, to help reduce the size of 3D files. It compresses vertex attributes, normals, colors, and texture coordinates.

GLB 

The GLB file format is a binary form of glTF that includes textures instead of referencing them as external images. GLB was introduced as an extension to glTF 1.0 and incorporated directly into glTF 2.0.

Derivative formats 
On August 10, 2015, 3D Tiles, now a proposed OGC Community Standard, built on glTF to add a spatial data structure, metadata, and declarative styling for streaming massive heterogeneous 3D geospatial datasets. VRM, a model format for VR, is built on the .glb format. It is a 3D humanoid avatar specification and file format.

Software ecosystem 

The glTF Sample Viewer is maintained by Khronos, as part of the glTF ecosystem, along with the Validator, which validates glTF assets.

glTF loaders are in open-source WebGL engines including PlayCanvas, Three.js, Babylon.js, Cesium, PEX, xeogl, and A-Frame. The Godot game engine also supports and recommends the glTF format. 

Open-source glTF converters are available from COLLADA, FBX, and OBJ. Assimp can import and export glTF.

glTF files can also be directly exported from a variety of 3D editors, such as Blender, Vectary, Autodesk 3ds Max (natively or using Verge3D exporter), Autodesk Maya (using babylon.js exporter), Autodesk Inventor, Modo, Houdini, Paint 3D, and Substance Painter.

Open-source glTF utility libraries are available for programming languages including JavaScript, Node.js, C++, C#, Java, Go, Rust, Haxe, Ada, and TypeScript.

An open-source glTF validator can validate if 3D models conform to the glTF specification.

3D Commerce, a working group of universal guidelines, standards and certifications for 3D content creation and distribution in e-commerce, incorporates glTF for transmission of photorealistic 3D assets. In June 2021, the 3D Commerce viewer certification program was launched, enabling 3D viewers to demonstrate they can accurately and reliably display 3D products using the glTF file format. 3D Commerce's asset guidelines, released in 2020, include best practices for use of the glTF file format in 3D Commerce.

See also 
 COLLADA
 Open Game Engine Exchange
 JSON
 Alembic (computer graphics)

References

External links 
 
 glTF specification

Cross-platform software
Graphics standards
Web development
WebGL
3D graphics file formats
JSON